Frankfurt Lokalbahnhof is an underground S-Bahn station in the district of Sachsenhausen of Frankfurt am Main, Germany. The station was opened when the City Tunnel was extended to Frankfurt South station in 1990. It consists of two tracks, surrounding a central platform.

The station is an important public transport interchange and is served by S-Bahn, tram and bus routes. The S-Bahn station is located underground, while the trams and buses run on the surface.

The station is named after the old Lokalbahnhof, the terminus of the former Frankfurt-Offenbach Local Railway, which served the neighbourhood from 1848 until 1955, with breaks at the end of World War I and II. Its terminus in Frankfurt was called the Lokalbahnhof (literally: "Local Railway station").

In 1990, the S-Bahn station was built about 250 metres south of the site of the historic Lokalbahnhof and the modern Lokalbahnhof tram stop. It is on the City Tunnel S-Bahn line that runs south from central Frankfurt and continues southeast towards Frankfurt South station.

Operations

The following lines stop at the station:
S-Bahn lines: S3, S4, S5 and S6,
 tram lines: 14, 15 and 16,
 bus routes: 36, 30, 45, 47, 653, OF-50.

References

External links

Rhine-Main S-Bahn stations
Railway stations in Germany opened in 1990
Railway stations located underground in Frankfurt